Houstonia (bluet) is a genus of plants in the family Rubiaceae. Many species were formerly classified, along with other genera since segregated elsewhere, in a more inclusive genus Hedyotis.

Bluets are often small and delicate. For example, H. rosea may grow only one inch tall. Some species are single stemmed and others have multiple stems in bunches. Flowers are blue, purple, lavender, white, or rose, often with shades of one color present in an individual population. Flowers have 4 sepals, colloquially denominated "petals", a salverform corolla with 4 lobes, and an inferior ovary. Some species exhibit heterostyly. The fruit is an often roughly cordate capsule enclosing many seeds and which usually dehisces via a suture across its apex.

Houstonia consists of 20 species native to North America. Another 5 species are classified in the genus Stenaria; Houstonia without Stenaria is paraphyletic. Close relatives of the genus are Oldenlandia microtheca and, more distantly, Arcytophyllum.

Its members superficially resembles species of the genus Myosotis (Forget-me-nots), but are distinguished from the latter by having only 4 sepals (petals) instead of 5.

Species
Species accepted as of May 2014 are:

 Houstonia acerosa (A.Gray) Benth. & Hook.f.: Chihuahua, Coahuila, Nuevo León, Tamaulipas, and San Luis Potosí and Texas and New Mexico, United States
 Houstonia biloba Raf.
 Houstonia caerulea L. (azure bluet): eastern Canada and eastern United States
 Houstonia canadensis Willd. ex Roem. & Schult. (Canadian summer bluet): Ontario and Saskatchewan, Canada and eastern United States
 Houstonia cervantesii Terrell
 Houstonia chlorantha Bertol.
 Houstonia correllii (W.H.Lewis) Terrell (Correll's bluet): Texas, United States
 Houstonia croftiae Britton & Rusby (Croft's bluet): Texas, United States
 Houstonia humifusa (Engelm. ex A.Gray) A.Gray (matted bluet): New Mexico, Oklahoma, and Texas, United States
 Houstonia longifolia Gaertn. (longleaf summer bluet): eastern and central United States and central Canada
 Houstonia micrantha (Shinners) Terrell (southern bluet): central and southeastern United States
 Houstonia nuttalliana Fosberg
 Houstonia ochroleuca Raf.
 Houstonia ouachitana (E.B.Sm.) Terrell (Ouachita bluet): Arkansas and Oklahoma, United States
 Houstonia palmeri A.Gray: Coahuila and Nuevo León
 Houstonia parviflora Holz. ex Greenm. (Greenman's bluet): Texas, United States
 Houstonia procumbens (J.F.Gmel.) Standl. (roundleaf bluet): Louisiana, Mississippi, Alabama, Georgia, Florida, and South Carolina, United States
 Houstonia prostata Brandegee
 Houstonia purpurea L. (Venus' pride): eastern and central United States
 Houstonia pusilla Schöpf (tiny bluet): central and southeastern United States and Arizona, United States
 Houstonia reticulata Raf.
 Houstonia rosea (Raf.) Terrell (rose bluet): south-central United States
 Houstonia rubra Cav. (red bluet): northern and central Mexico as far south as Puebla and Arizona, New Mexico, Texas, and Utah, United States
 Houstonia serpyllifolia Michx. (creeping, mountain, thymeleaft, and Appalachian bluet): Appalachian Mountains from Pennsylvania to Georgia, United States
 Houstonia sharpii  Terrell: Hidalgo and Veracruz
 Houstonia spellenbergii (G.L.Nesom & Vorobik) Terrell: Chihuahua
 Houstonia subviscosa (C.Wright ex A.Gray) A.Gray (nodding bluet): Texas, United States
 Houstonia teretifolia  Terrell: Coahuila
 Houstonia wrightii A.Gray (pygmy bluet): Arizona, New Mexico, and Texas, United States and Mexico

References

 
Rubiaceae genera
Flora of North America